The Frank J. Tyler House is a historic house at 240 Linden Street in Waltham, Massachusetts.

Overview
Built in 1894, this -story wood-frame house is one of Waltham's finest Queen Anne Victorians. It is particularly distinguished by its elaborate three-story tower, which has a conical roof and bands of decorative shingles. The main entry is framed on the left by the tower, and on the right by a polygonal bay that rises a full two stories, and is capped by a squared-off projecting gable. The gable tympanum is filled by a three-bay window and clad in decorative cut shingles. The main entry is sheltered by a porch supported by paired Tuscan columns. The paneled door is flanked by sidelight windows and topped by a transom window.

Despite its location in a fashionable neighborhood of the city and the relatively high quality of its construction, the house was used as a rental property, passing through a large number of nonresident owners until 1907. Frank J. Tyler, who subdivided his property and built it on speculation, was a Boston-based manufacturer of agricultural machinery.

The house was listed on the National Register of Historic Places in 1989, where it is listed at 238 Linden Street.

See also
National Register of Historic Places listings in Waltham, Massachusetts

References

Houses in Waltham, Massachusetts
Houses on the National Register of Historic Places in Waltham, Massachusetts
Queen Anne architecture in Massachusetts
Houses completed in 1894